Events from the year 1671 in France.

Incumbents 
Monarch: Louis XIV

Events
 
 
 
 
 
 
 December 30 – The Académie royale d'architecture is founded by Louis XIV of France in Paris, the world's first school of architecture.

Births
 

 
 January 11 – François-Marie, 1st duc de Broglie, French military leader (d. 1745)
 April 6 – Jean-Baptiste Rousseau, French poet (d. 1741)
 July 14 – Jacques d'Allonville, French astronomer and mathematician (d. 1732)

Deaths

See also

References

1670s in France